Eryphus is a genus of beetles in the family Cerambycidae, containing the following species:

 Eryphus bipunctatus (Perty, 1832)
 Eryphus bivittatus (Melzer, 1934)
 Eryphus carinatus (Zajciw, 1970)
 Eryphus carioca Napp & Martins, 2002
 Eryphus flavicollis (Fisher, 1938)
 Eryphus laetus (Blanchard in Gay, 1851)
 Eryphus marginatus (Zajciw, 1970)
 Eryphus picticollis (Gounelle, 1911)
 Eryphus tacuarembo Napp & Martins, 2002
 Eryphus transversalis (Fairmaire & Germain, 1864)

References

Heteropsini